The Eagle Sandstone, originally the Eagle Formation, is a geological formation in Montana whose strata date back to the Late Cretaceous. It is a light to brownish gray to pale yellow-orange, fine-grained sandstone. It contains areas of crossbedding and local shale members. It contains large (up to 15 feet in diameter) sandy calcareous concretions. Its thickness varies from 100 to 350 feet due to the lens nature of the individual sandstone layers and local interbedded sandy shale layers.

Dinosaur fossils have been recovered from the formation.

Weathering and erosion of the formation has created natural arches, hoodoos and other picturesque features of the Upper Missouri River Breaks National Monument.

Vertebrate paleofauna
 "Ornithomimus" grandis - Pes.

See also

 List of dinosaur-bearing rock formations
 List of fossiliferous stratigraphic units in Montana
 Paleontology in Montana

References

Bibliography
 

Shale formations of the United States
Cretaceous Montana
Campanian Stage